Charles Henry Bartlett (6 February 1885, in Bermondsey, London – 30 November 1968, in Enfield) was a British track cyclist. He competed in the 1908 Summer Olympics where he won the gold medal in the 100 kilometres competition, completing the course in a time of 2 hours 41 minutes and 48.6 seconds.

References

External links
 
 

1885 births
1968 deaths
English male cyclists
English track cyclists
Olympic cyclists of Great Britain
Cyclists at the 1908 Summer Olympics
Olympic gold medallists for Great Britain
English Olympic medallists
People from Bermondsey
Cyclists from Greater London
Olympic medalists in cycling
Medalists at the 1908 Summer Olympics